Obi or OBI may refer to:

People
 Obi (name), a list of people with either the surname or given name
 Mikel John Obi (born 1987), Nigerian footballer also known as Mikel John Obi and John Obi Mikel
 Saint Obi, Nigerian actor and film director Obinna Nwafor

Places
 Obi, Nasarawa State, Nigeria, a Local Government Area
 Obi, Nigeria, a town and Local Government Area in Benue State
 Obi Islands, Indonesia
 Obi (island), also called Obira, the largest of the Obi Islands
 Ob (river), Russia, also known as Obi
 6669 Obi, an asteroid

OBI
 Oak Beach Inn
 Obliteration by incorporation, a concept in sociology of science: when a discovery, or a theory, is no longer directly attributed to its author because it is considered common knowledge
 Ontology for Biomedical Investigations, an international cross-domain ontology effort
 Operation Blessing International
 Optical Borehole Imaging, a system to visually inspect and record images of the walls of a borehole, detecting breakouts and investigating the stratigraphy, or the structure, of the rock in sedimentary, or igneous, geological formations
 Oracle Business Intelligence Suite Enterprise Edition, software owned by Oracle Corporation
 Order of British India
 Orion Bus Industries, formerly Ontario Bus Industries, a bus manufacturer
 Our Boys Institute, a junior chapter of the YMCA in Adelaide, South Australia

Other uses
 Obi (sash), a sash worn with a kimono or with the uniforms used by practitioners of Japanese martial arts
 Obi (martial arts)
 Obi (retail chain), a European home improvement store chain based in Germany
 Obi (ruler), a title among the Igbo people of Nigeria or the central building in an Igbo homestead
 Obi of Onitsha, traditional ruler of Onitsha
 Obi, another form of the word Obeah
 Obi (publishing), an informational piece of paper or cardboard folded around or over a book or LP record, music CD, video game, or magazine, used in Japan
 Obi (band), a British indie music band from the early 2000s
 Obi Castle, a Japanese castle completed in 1588
 Obi Station, a train station in Nichinan, Miyazaki, Japan
 obi, ISO 639 code for the Obispeño language, an extinct Native American language
 OBI, FAA location identifier for Woodbine Municipal Airport (New Jersey)

See also
 Obi Obi, Queensland, Australia, a suburb of Gold Coast
 Obi-Wan Kenobi, fictional character from the Star Wars universe
Oobi a children's show that aired on Noggin from 2000 to 2005 
 Obie (disambiguation)